Questembert is a commune in the Morbihan department in Brittany in north-western France.

Demographics
Inhabitants of Questembert are called Questembertois. Its population was 7,723 as of 2018.

Breton language

In 2008, there 3.61% of local children attended bilingual schools in primary education, learning partly in Breton.

See also
Communes of the Morbihan department

References

External links

 Tourism Office website
 
 Mayors of Morbihan Association 

Communes of Morbihan